Eddie Brown (10 October 1877 – 29 November 1934) was an  Australian rules footballer who played with South Melbourne in the Victorian Football League (VFL).

Notes

External links 

1877 births
1934 deaths
Australian rules footballers from Victoria (Australia)
Sydney Swans players
Caulfield Football Club players